Creus means crosses in Catalan. It may refer to:

 Cap de Creus, Spain
 Santes Creus, Spain

People with the surname
 Alicia Creus (born 1939), Argentinian artist
 Antonio Creus (1924–1996), Spanish motorcycle racer
 Camille Decreus (1876–1939), French composer and pianist
 Joan Abella i Creus (born 1968), Spanish mineralogist
 Joan Creus (born 1956), Spanish basketball player
 Julian Creus (1917–1992), British weightlifter
 Miguel Albareda Creus (1919–2012), Spanish chess player
 Teresa Claramunt Creus (1862–1931), Spanish anarcho-syndicalist
 Xavi Hernández Creus (born 1980), Spanish football player

See also
 
 Creuse (disambiguation)